The Morocco national rugby sevens team has competed in various international tournaments, including the Hong Kong Sevens. Morocco participated at the 2016 Hong Kong Sevens, they reached the quarterfinals of the World Series Qualifier.

Tournament history

Rugby World Cup Sevens

Hong Kong Sevens

2016

Qualifier Quarterfinals

Players

Previous Squads

2001 A 2003 Rhaili anwar akram, Mouhcine ouajdi, Adelilah ouzoulif, Noubi hassane, Mehdi el affifi, Omar alaoui, Hicham arad ,Chouale, Zouhadi mehdi, Nabil lamsika ,Ouaragh, Abdelmalik rachid,

References

External links

Rugby union in Morocco
Morocco national rugby union team
National rugby sevens teams